Instituto Nacional de Deportes, Educación Fisica y Recreación  is the body responsible for sports development, physical education and recreation in Cuba.

It was founded in February 23, 1961, it is protected by Law 936. The national headquarters is located in the Coliseo de la Ciudad Deportiva in Havana.

In March 1962, a new institution demanded a Resolution that forbids any professional sports to be  practiced on the Island, with the aim of promoting healthy practice and preventing mercantile system in sport.

References

1961 establishments in Cuba
Sports organizations established in 1961
Organizations based in Havana
Sports governing bodies in Cuba
Sports ministries
Government ministries of Cuba